Ons Jabeur was the defending champion, but lost in the quarterfinals to María Irigoyen.

Irigoyen then went on to win the title, defeating Cindy Burger in the final, 6–2, 7–5.

Seeds

Main draw

Finals

Top half

Bottom half

References 
 Main draw

Nana Trophy - Singles